Crows Nest is a rural town and locality in the Toowoomba Region, Queensland, Australia.

History
Jarowair (also known as Yarowair, Yarow-wair, Barrunggam, Yarrowair, Yarowwair and Yarrow-weir) is one of the languages of the Toowoomba region. The Jarowair language region includes the landscape within the local government boundaries of the Toowoomba Regional Council, particularly Toowoomba north to Crows Nest and west to Oakey. Giabal is the Southern neighbour in Toowoomba City.

Crows Nest, established on Dalla tribal lands, was declared a town in 1876. Crows Nest Post Office opened on 1 July 1878. A branch railway line from Toowoomba, which serviced a number of sawmills and a dairying district, was finished in 1886.

In December 1880, the Primitive Methodist Church purchased  of land for a church. The church opened on Easter Sunday on 17 April 1881. On Sunday 31 December 1905, a new Crows Nest Methodist Church was officially opened by Reverend Henry Youngman, replacing the 1880 church. The land cost £160 and the building £360, a total of £520. In 1956, the church was remodelled. After the Methodist Church amalgamated into the Uniting Church in Australia in 1977, it became the Crows Nest District Uniting Church.

It is claimed by some that the town was named after an Aboriginal man, Jimmy Crow, who gave directions to early European settlers. He lived in a big hollow tree near the police station, which became known as Crows Nest. It became a popular overnight camp for the bullock teams hauling timber, which in turn attracted farmers and settlers. A 6-foot 6-inch high statue of Jimmy Crow was unveiled in the Centenary Park at Crows Nest on 12 July 1969 by Minister for Labour and Tourism, John Herbert. The statue was sculpted by Fred Gardiner of the Tia Art Gallery. The statue was cut from a single block of Helidon freestone and weighs over one ton. An 18-foot high hollow tree stump was also moved to Centenary Park and a fig tree was planted on top so the roots could be trained around it to form a living hollow tree. It is believed to be the only memorial in Australia to an Aboriginal person after whom a town was named.

However, it is also claimed that the name derives from the indigenous name for the area Tookoogandanna, meaning "the home of crows". Some researchers acknowledge there are many possible origins of the name.

In 1913, the Shire of Crows Nest was formed with the town becoming the administrative centre for the new local government area. The shire expanded in 1949 and was merged into the Toowoomba Region local government area in 2008. In the 1950s and 60s the town's population declined, together with the local industries.

On Saturday 7 April 1951 Archbishop Reginald Halse dedicated a new Anglican church in Crows Nest, built from concrete blocks. In 2019 the Anglican parish of Crows Nest entered in a partnership with St David's Anglican Church in Chelmer, Brisbane, to share their ministry through a combination of services at the various churches combined with online services from St David's. It is an experiment in how the Anglican Church may operate in the future.

Heritage listings
Crows Nest has a number of heritage-listed sites, including:
 19 Curnow Street: Crows Nest Post Office

Amenities
Town facilities include a large pavilion for sports activities and other functions, showgrounds and a 25 m heated swimming pool.  east of the town is the Crows Nest National Park.

The John French V.C. Memorial Library is open Monday to Saturday; the name commemorating Jack French, a local man who was killed in World War II and was awarded the Victoria Cross for his valour in the face of the enemy. The library is located on the corner of William Street and the New England Highway and is operated by the Toowoomba Regional Council. The current library facility opened in 1996 with a major refurbishment in 2014.

Crows Nest Regional Art Gallery is located in the same building as the Crows Nest Library, and is also used to showcase local talent.

The Crows Nest branch of the Queensland Country Women's Association meets at 7 Thallon Street.

St George's Anglican Church is at 13 Thallon Street.

St Matthew's Catholic Church is at 20 Creek Street.

Crows Nest District Uniting Church is at 17-19 Emu Creek Road.

Education 
Crow's Nest State School is a government primary and secondary (Prep-10) school for boys and girls at 1 Littleton Street. In 2018, the school had an enrolment of 323 students with 32 teachers (28 full-time equivalent) and 20 non-teaching staff (13 full-time equivalent). It includes a special education program.

Notable residents
 Jack French, recipient of the Victoria Cross

References

Further reading

External links

Crows Nest: Queensland Places
Crows Nest Pioneer wall
The Crow Call community newsgroup

 
Towns in Queensland
Towns in the Darling Downs
Populated places established in 1876
1876 establishments in Australia
Localities in Queensland